Koshy Koshy also spelled as Koshi Koshi (1825–1899) was an Indian Anglican priest and Malayalam novelist.

Early life 
Koshy was born in the Kingdom of Travancore, to a Nazrani family, part of the Malankara Syrian Church. However, when he was 11 years old (1836), his family converted to Anglicanism, under the influence of the Church Mission Society.

Priesthood 
Koshy desired to enter his Church's ministry and studied at the Pazhaya Seminary, Kottayam. By 1844, he was a scholar in Sanskrit, Latin and English languages. In 1856, he was received into the diaconate. In 1859, he was ordained as a priest in the Anglican Church. In the nineteenth century, the highest office attained by Indians within the Anglican Church was that of an archdeacon. In 1885, Rev. K. Koshy became the first Indian to be raised to the rank of an archdeacon.

Literary pursuits 
Archdeacon Koshy was one of the original Malayalam litterateurs. He wrote over 10 books, including Pulleli Kunju, Bhasmakuri and Thiruvavatharamahatmyam. Pulleli Kunju (1882) is regarded as the first novellike original work on a local theme, in Malayalam. He also translated John Bunyan's The Pilgrim's Progress (Paradesi Mokshayathra, 1845) and The Holy War (Thirupporattam), to Malayalam.

Adn. Koshy was the editor of Njananikshepam (published since 1840), the first Malayalam periodical. His most important religious contribution was with respect to the revision of the Malayalam Bible (1872–1898). The Archbishop of Canterbury Edward White Benson conferred on Koshy, a Lambeth Doctorate, for his pre-eminent role in that.

See also 
Saint Thomas Anglicans

References

Bibliography 

 
 
 
 
 
 
 

Saint Thomas Christians
Indian Anglicans
People of the Kingdom of Travancore
19th-century Indian novelists
Novelists from Kerala